The 1963 Stratford by-election was a by-election held on 15 August 1963 for the British House of Commons constituency of Stratford-on-Avon in Warwickshire.

The by-election was caused by the resignation of the constituency's Conservative Party Member of Parliament (MP) John Profumo on 6 June 1963 after the Profumo affair scandal.

The result was a Conservative Party hold, with Angus Maude winning a massively-reduced majority of almost 3,470 votes.

The by-election was the first of many to be contested by David Sutch, later known as "Screaming Lord Sutch".

Votes

References 

Politics of Stratford-upon-Avon
1963 elections in the United Kingdom
1963 in England
20th century in Warwickshire
By-elections to the Parliament of the United Kingdom in Warwickshire constituencies